The Roman Catholic Diocese of Ambanja is a diocese located in the city of Ambanja in the Ecclesiastical province of the Metropolitan Archdiocese of Antsiranana in Madagascar. Its episcopal see is the Cathedral of Saint Joseph, which was constructed in 1933.

History 
On September 4, 1848, the Apostolic Prefecture of Isole di Mayotta, Nossi-Bé e Comore was established from the Apostolic Vicariate of Madagascar. In 1843 the French Government, called in by the sultan, had taken possession of Mayotte, which became, with Nossi-Bé, a post of surveillance over Madagascar. These islands later formed a French colony, with a population largely Muslim. Mayotte, Nossi-Bé and the Comoros were made an Apostolic prefecture and confided to the Fathers of the Holy Ghost.
 
In 1898, when the same missionaries were given the ecclesiastical administration of Northern Madagascar, these smaller islands and Santa Maria were attached to the then Apostolic Vicariate of Diégo-Suarez. Santa Maria and Nossi-Bé had resident missionaries.

 June 14, 1938: Renamed as Apostolic Prefecture of Ambanja
 Promoted on March 8, 1951 as Apostolic Vicariate of Ambanja
 Promoted on September 14, 1955 as Diocese of Ambanja, yet remains dependent in Rome on the missionary Congregation for the Evangelization of Peoples
 On 5 June 1975, it lost its original missionary territory (modern Comoros and Mayotte) to establish the exempt Apostolic Administration of the Comoros Archipelago.

Incumbent Ordinaries 
all Roman Rite (Latin)

 Apostolic Prefect of Mayotte, Nosy-Be and Comore 
 Friar Callisto Lopinot, Capuchin Franciscans (O.F.M. Cap.) (1932.05.15 – 1937)

 Apostolic Prefect of Ambanja
 Fr. Léon-Adolphe Messmer, O.F.M. Cap. (1937.11.12 – 1951.03.08 see below)

 Apostolic Vicar of Ambanja 
 Bishop Léon-Adolphe Messmer, O.F.M. Cap., Titular Bishop of Coropissus  (see above 1951.03.08 – 1955.09.14 see below)

Suffragan Bishops of Ambanja
 Léon-Adolphe Messmer, O.F.M. Cap. (see above 1955.09.14 – 1975.06.05), later permanent Apostolic Administrator of Comores (Comoros) (1975.06.05 – 1980.05.02)
 Ferdinand Botsy, O.F.M. Cap. (1976.07.08 – 1997.10.25)
 Odon Marie Arsène Razanakolona (1998.11.28 – 2005.12.07), later Metropolitan Archbishop of Antananarivo (Madagascar) (2005.12.07 – ...), 
'' remaining Apostolic Administrator (2005.12.07 – 2007.11.07)
 Rosario Saro Vella, Salesians (S.D.B.) (2007.11.07 – 2019.07.08), appointed Bishop of Moramanga
 Donatien Francis Randriamalala, M.S. (2022.11.11 – ...)

See also 
 Roman Catholicism in Madagascar

References

Sources and External Links 
 GCatholic.org with incumbent bio links
 Catholic Hierarchy

Roman Catholic dioceses in Madagascar
Catholic Church in the Comoros
Catholic Church in Madagascar
Catholic Church in Mayotte
Religion in Diana Region
Ambanja
Religious organizations established in 1848
Roman Catholic dioceses and prelatures established in the 19th century
1938 establishments in Madagascar
Roman Catholic Ecclesiastical Province of Antsiranana